Lars Helge Birkeland (born 11 February 1988) is a retired Norwegian biathlete.

Biathlon results
All results are sourced from the International Biathlon Union.

Olympic Games
1 medal (1 silver)

*The mixed relay was added as an event in 2014.

World Championships
1 medal (1 gold)

*During Olympic seasons competitions are only held for those events not included in the Olympic program.
**The mixed relay was added as an event in 2005.

References

External links
 
 
 
 
 

1988 births
Living people
People from Birkenes
Norwegian male biathletes
Biathletes at the 2018 Winter Olympics
Olympic biathletes of Norway
Medalists at the 2018 Winter Olympics
Olympic medalists in biathlon
Olympic silver medalists for Norway
Biathlon World Championships medalists
Sportspeople from Agder